Telicota augias, the bright-orange darter, is a butterfly of the family Hesperiidae. It is found in Australia, Papua New Guinea, Myanmar, Indonesia and the Philippines.

The wingspan is about 30 mm.

The larvae feed on Flagellaria indica. It constructs a shelter out of leaves joined with silk, resting head downward in this by day, emerging to feed at night. The shelter is often constructed near the tip of the leaf on which it feeds, leaving only the midrib to support the shelter.

Subspecies
Telicota augias augias (Burma to Java and Borneo)
Telicota augias florina (southern Flores)
Telicota augias krefftii (Macleay, 1866) – Krefft's darter (the northern Gulf and northern coast of the Northern Territory, the northern Gulf and north-eastern coast of Queensland and the northern coast of Western Australia)
Telicota augias pythias (Philippines)

External links
Australian Insects
Australian Faunal Directory

Butterflies described in 1763
Taractrocerini
Butterflies of Singapore
Butterflies of Indochina
Butterflies of Oceania
Taxa named by Carl Linnaeus